Qezelcheh may refer to:
 Qezelcheh, East Azerbaijan
 Qezelcheh-ye Pashmak
 Qezelcheh-ye Aq Emam
 Qezelcheh Gol, West Azerbaijan Province

See also
 Qezeljeh (disambiguation)